A fortified house or fortified mansion is a type of building which developed in Europe during the Middle Ages, generally with significant fortifications added.

United States
In the United States, historically a fortified house was often called a fort or station depending on the region. This was a building built for defense against primarily Indian attacks in frontier areas. While some fortified houses were sometimes used by militias, state and federal military units, their primary purpose was for private or civilian defense. Sometimes a stockade would surround the building(s).

Examples of historic private or civilian fortified houses built include;
Fort Nelson and Floyd's Station and Low Dutch Station all in Kentucky.
Mormon Fort and Mormon Station in Nevada.
Fort Buenaventura, Cove Fort, Fort Deseret, and Fort Utah all in Utah.
Carpenter's Fort in Ohio.

In the present day, fortified houses are houses with physical security features, including using enhanced locks, security bars, solid core or metal doors, perimeter alarms, cameras, security guards to deter or delay assault.

See also
Tower house
Manor house
Block house
Fortified houses in Ireland
 Bastle house

References

 
Castles by type